This is a list of Georgia suffragists, suffrage groups and others associated with the cause of women's suffrage in Georgia.

Groups 

 Atlanta Equal Suffrage League.
 Augusta Equal Suffrage Association.
 Business People's Suffrage Association.
 Chatham County Branch of the Equal Suffrage Party of Georgia.
 DeKalb Equal Suffrage Party.
 Equal Suffrage Party of Augusta.
 Equal Suffrage Party of Georgia.
 Fulton Equal Suffrage Party.
 Georgia Men's League for Woman Suffrage.
 Georgia Woman Equal Suffrage League, formed in 1913.
 Georgia Woman Suffrage Association (GWSA).
 Georgia Young People's Suffrage Association, created in 1913.
 Muscogee Equal Franchise League, formed in 1913.
 National Woman's Party of Georgia, formed in 1917.
 National Association of Colored Women (NACW).
 Savannah Woman Suffrage Association, created in November 1914.

Suffragists 

 Mary Harris Armor.
 Rose Ashby.
 Janie Porter Barrett.
 Ruth Buckholz.
 Beatrice Carleton.
 Beatrice Castleton (Atlanta).
 Rebecca Latimer Felton.
 Leonard Grossman.
 Will Harben (Dalton).
 Walter B. Hill (Macon).
 Lugenia Burns Hope (Atlanta).
 Helen Augusta Howard (Columbus).
 Jane Judge (Savannah).
 Lucy Laney (Augusta).
 Adella Hunt Logan.
 Emma T. Martin.
 Mary Latimer McClendon (Atlanta).
 Emily C. McDougald.
 Mary McCurdy.
 Mary Raoul Millis.
 Eleanor Raoul (Atlanta).
 Frances Smith Whiteside.
 Mamie George S. Williams (Savannah).

Politicians supporting women's suffrage 

 Hugh Dorsey.
 William J. Harris.
 John L. Hopkins.
 Livingston Mimms (Atlanta).

Places 

 De Give's Grand Opera House.

Suffragists who campaigned in Georgia 

 Jane Addams.
 Beulah Amidon.
 Susan B. Anthony.
 Henry Blackwell.
 Lillie Devereaux Blake.
 Ida Porter Boyer.
 Madeline McDowell Breckinridge.
 Carrie Chapman Catt.
 Jean Gordon.
 Kate M. Gordon.
 Josephine K. Henry.
 Elsie Hill.
 Solon H. Jacobs.
 Belle Kearney.
 Catherine Kenny.
 Harriet Burton Laidlaw.
 Lide A. Meriwether.
 Helen Ring Robinson.
 Anna Howard Shaw.
 Mabel Vernon.
 Elizabeth Upham Yates.
 Virginia D. Young.

Anti-suffragists in Georgia 
Groups

 Georgia Association Opposed to Woman Suffrage, formed in 1914 in Macon.

People

 Warren Candler.
 Eugenia Dorothy Blount Lamar.
 Caroline Patterson (Macon).
 Mildred Lewis Rutherford.
 Hoke Smith.

See also 

 Timeline of women's suffrage in Georgia (U.S. state)
 Women's suffrage in Georgia (U.S. state)
 Women's suffrage in states of the United States
 Women's suffrage in the United States.

References

Sources

External links 
 Today in Georgia history

American women's rights activists
Georgia (U.S. state) suffrage
American suffragists
Georgia
Activists from Georgia (U.S. state)
History of Georgia (U.S. state)
Lists of people from Georgia (U.S. state)